The Riot Within: My Journey from Rebellion to Redemption is a 2012 autobiography of Rodney King (1965–2012). Known by a videotape as a victim of Los Angeles Police Department brutality, he became a civil rights icon. The book is co-authored by Lawrence J. Spagnola, an award-winning writer.

Context
King discusses his childhood growing up among loving parents but at times an abusive father, and their shared love for fishing. His father was alcoholic, and he also has had to deal with alcoholism in his adult life. King speaks highly of his teacher Robert E. Jones at John Muir High School, who was openly gay.  He discusses his descent into addiction and alcoholism and his run-ins with the law, including when he was stopped and beaten by Los Angeles Police officers. This event was videotaped by a bystander, and carried on national news. There was outrage when the officers were acquitted of charges of excessive force. King reflects on his multicultural heritage. He said that he did not want the 1992 Los Angeles riots that followed the acquittal of the officers at trial. 

King reflects his reluctance as a civil rights icon, after a federal trial in which two of the officers were convicted. The city of LA made a settlement with him, paying damages. He felt as if he attracted opportunists and was used by some. He continued to battle addiction and other issues. The book finally wraps up with his obtaining sobriety and discussing lessons he has learned.

Reception

The Riot Within received mostly positive reviews by both the independent and mainstream media.

Amazon categorization controversy  
The Riot Within was classified by Amazon as a "Criminal Biography" and was listed next to books about serial killers, mob bosses and hackers. Amazon did not respond to a request for a comment from the Los Angeles Times about the error. The book was eventually re-classified under "Memoir and Historical".

References

1992 Los Angeles riots
2012 non-fiction books
African-American autobiographies
Books by Rodney King
Collaborative autobiographies
HarperCollins books